The Platino Award for Best Documentary (Spanish: Premio Platino al mejor película documental) is one of the Platino Awards, Ibero-America's film awards, presented by the Entidad de Gestión de Derechos de los Productores Audiovisuales (EGEDA) and the Federación Iberoamericana de Productores Cinematográficos y Audiovisuales (FIPCA). It was first presented in 2014, with the Spanish documentary Con la pata quebrada being the first recipient of the award. Spain holds the record of mot wins in the category with six.

2021 winner The Mole Agent also received a nomination for the Academy Award for Best Documentary Feature.

In the list below. the winner of the award for each year is shown first, followed by the other nominees.

Awards and nominations

2010s

2020s

Awards by nation

See also
 Goya Award for Best Documentary
 Academy Award for Best Documentary Feature

References

External links
Official site

Awards for best film